Matthias Becker (born 19 April 1974 in Frankfurt am Main) is a German former professional footballer who played as a forward.

References

External links 
 

1974 births
Living people
German footballers
Association football forwards
Eintracht Frankfurt players
Eintracht Frankfurt II players
VfB Stuttgart players
Hannover 96 players
Kickers Offenbach players
Bundesliga players
2. Bundesliga players
Footballers from Frankfurt
West German footballers